Kemuri (Japanese for smoke) is a Japanese-American ska punk band formed in Oxnard, California in 1995. They have an upbeat sound with positive lyrics which they refer to as PMA (positive mental attitude). While the majority of their songs are in English, they also have some songs in Japanese. After their reformation in 2012, they released four more albums and continue to tour actively.

Break up and reunion 
On December 12, 2007, Kemuri posted a message on their website stating they would no longer play together as a band. They said they had done much more than they expected as a band and that this break up would be the most positive conclusion to their band (keeping in line with their PMA message).  Their last show was on 9 December 2007, at the Zepp in Tokyo also their final show in Oxnard, California. In 2012, Kemuri made their reunion tour in Tokyo and in the U.S. The first new album after the reunion, "All for This!," was released on 6 June 2013.
In 2012, the band re-formed again and continues to perform in all over Asia, Japan, Europe and in the United States and in other countries worldwide.

Band members 
 , Vocals
 , Bass
 , Guitar
 , Drums
 , Saxophone
 , Trumpet
 , Trombone

Former members
 , drums 1995–1996
 Mike Park, tenor saxophone, Mike left kemuri in 1997 after kemuri's first album little playmate.
 Ryosuke Morimura (Deceased)
 Hidenori Minami

Discography 
 Little Playmate (1997)
 77 Days (1998)
 Senka-Senrui (2000)
 Emotivation (2001)
 Circles (2004)
 Wating for the Rain (2005)
 Principle (2005)
 Our PMA (2007)
 All for This! (2013)
 Rampant (2014)
 F (2015)
 FREEDOMOSH (2017)
 Ko-Ou-Doku-Mai (2018)

References

External links 
 Universal's Band Web site

Japanese rock music groups
Japanese ska groups
Musical groups from Ventura County, California
Musicians from Oxnard, California
Ska punk musical groups